Bloxham is an unincorporated community in Leon County, Florida, United States. The community is located at the intersection of State Roads 20 and 267.

Notes

Unincorporated communities in Leon County, Florida
Unincorporated communities in Florida